Joyner is an unincorporated community in Morgan County, Tennessee, United States.  Joyner is between Wartburg and Oliver Springs on Tennessee State Route 62.  Frozen Head State Park is nearby. Joyner's elementary school serves both Joyner and the town of Petros to the north.

Unincorporated communities in Tennessee
Unincorporated communities in Morgan County, Tennessee